(Thomas) John Cleary (born 29 June 1947) is a former Australian politician. He was born in Launceston, Tasmania. In 1979, he was elected to the Tasmanian House of Assembly representing Franklin for the Liberal Party. He served as a minister from 1983 to 1986, when he was defeated; he was re-elected in 1988 and held the seat until his retirement in 1998. After leaving Tasmanian politics he spent a time as administrator of the Tiwi Islands while they were excised from Australian refugee status in 2003.

References

1947 births
Living people
Liberal Party of Australia members of the Parliament of Tasmania
Members of the Tasmanian House of Assembly